Saa-boo-Three is an Indian game of toss that can be used in any sport to determine the order of playing, especially if it is a singles competition involving three or more players. A hand game used mainly as a fast simultaneous It is popularly originating from the indian state of Tamil Nadu.selection/elimination method, Saa Boo Three can be played by two or more people. This game is mostly used as a selection/elimination method than a game. The most common use is in selecting the thief and police in the Thief and Police game. Other games that use this as a selection or elimination method are hide-and-seek and touch and out.

Rules
Usually, all players who want to play the game form a circle. They then stack hands on top of each other's wrists with their wrist on top and shout the words "saa" "boo" "three" in a very loud voice and players can now choose to either keep their hands in the same position or can alter it by turning their palm side to face up. Then, the number of persons with their palm-side is counted and if it adds up to less than the number of people with wrist-side then all players are counted out from the toss and vice versa. Then, the process is carried on until two players are left out. Then another player who has been the third outer comes and says "Who copies me is the outer?" and the third outer will either keep their hands in the same position or can alter it by turning their palm side to face up again and the two persons will also do the same. If one of their hand's side is same as the third outer, he get the chance to play as  first or last depending on the situation. If none of the two players hand's side is same as the third outer, they will continue the process till they find out the outer.

Advantages
This is the cheapest mode of tossing in any sport without causing any misunderstandings among the players. It usually takes less than a minute to perform. It can be particularly useful if a singles competition involves more than 7 people. Though it has been used in team competitions it is popular only with singles competition. This is not only used as selecting a team to play first, but it is also played simply as an interesting game. It is not used by most people to choose the team as they think this is childish. But they do not know the enjoyment of this game. Most of the people prefer tossing. But children usually use this method to play and select the outer.

References

Hand games